Candles is the fourth studio album by the British pop, funk, disco band Heatwave. It was produced by lead singer Johnnie Wilder, Jr. and James Guthrie. It made number 71 on the Billboard LP and Tapes chart, dated 17 January 1980.

It was the last Heatwave album to be released on the GTO record label before it was wrapped up in late 1981.

The album was remastered and reissued on compact disc (CD) with bonus tracks in 2010 by Big Break Records (CDBBR 0024).

Track listing

Personnel
Heatwave
Rod Temperton – writer / composer, rhythm track arrangements, vocal arrangements
Johnnie Wilder, Jr. – lead and backing vocals
Keith Wilder – lead vocals
J.D. Nicholas – lead and backing vocals
William L. Jones – lead and rhythm guitars, backing vocals
Calvin Duke – keyboards
Derek Bramble – bass
Ernest "Bilbo" Berger – drums

Charts

Singles
{|class=wikitable style=text-align:center
!rowspan=2|year
!rowspan=2|title
!colspan=3|peak chartpositions
|-style=font-size:smaller
!width=30|UK
!width=30|US
!width=30|USR&B
|-
|rowspan=1|1980
|align=left|Gangsters of the Groove||19||110||21
|-
|rowspan=4|1981
|align=left|Where Did I Go Wrong||–||–||74
|-
|align=left|Jitterbuggin'''||34||–||–
|-
|align=left|Posin' Til Closin'||–||–||–
|-
|align=left|Turn Around||–||–||–
|}

References

External linksCandles'' at Discogs

1981 albums
Heatwave (band) albums
GTO Records albums
Epic Records albums